Sydney Girls High School (abbreviated as SGHS or Sydney Girls) is a government-funded single-sex academically selective secondary day school  located at Moore Park, in Sydney, New South Wales, Australia.

Established in 1883 and operated by the New South Wales Department of Education and Communities, as a school within the Port Jackson Education Area of the Sydney Region, the school has approximately 940 students from Years 7 to 12 and is situated adjacent to its "brother school", Sydney Boys High School.

Sydney Girls High School NSW Rankings by ATAR: 4th in 2007, 2008 and 2009, 5th in 2010, 6th in 2011, 4th in 2012, 6th in 2013, 4th in 2014, 3rd in 2015, 13th in 2016, 4th in 2017 and 4th in 2018. It ranked 2nd best based on HSC results overall for girls' high schools in NSW in 2019.

History
Established as Sydney High School in 1883, the school grounds were originally located on Elizabeth Street in the Sydney central business district, where the David Jones store now stands. At the time, the school building was two storeys, blocked off by a high wall. The ground floor was occupied by male students, while the females occupied the first floor. This was usual in the 1800s.

Because of high levels of noise pollution from transport and other activities, the boys' school moved to a different location, followed by the girls' school, which became Sydney Girls High School. The two adjacent streets, Anzac Parade and Cleveland Street, are both large and busy roads that still make classrooms noisy from time to time.

In 1921, SGHS moved to the former Sydney Zoo (now Taronga Zoo in Mosman, New South Wales) site, which was formerly known as the "Billy Goat Swamp". It is opposite Moore Park, Fox Studios, and the Sydney Cricket Ground. The new building incorporated many modern features, provided large areas of greenery and was quieter. The bear pit from Sydney Zoo still stands within the schools' "Lowers" grass area, shared with Sydney Boys' "the Flat". SGHS students supported the war effort on the home front in both World War I and World War II by organising care packages and knitting socks and other clothing items for the soldiers on the front.

In April 1999, a severe hailstorm in Sydney caused significant damage to the school grounds, destroying areas of the roof and causing water leakage into many of the classrooms. This storm also destroyed much of the obsolete computer technology and paved the way for a large base of new technology throughout the school.

Academics

Enrolments
The Year 7 intake is of 150 students, but prospective students in higher years may matriculate to the school if vacancies exist. Offers of admission and matriculation into the school in Year 7 are made on the basis of academic merit, as assessed by the Selective High School Placement Test.

In Years 7 to 10, the cohorts consist of 150 students each year; in Years 11 to 12, however, the cohorts consist of  up to 180 students each year.

Departments
SGHS teaches the following subjects for the Higher School Certificate:

English
English Advanced
English Extension 1 
English Extension 2
Mathematics
Mathematics Extension 1
Mathematics Extension 2
Science
Biology
Chemistry
Physics
Drama
Economics
Engineering Studies
Food Technology
History
Ancient History
Modern History
History Extension
Languages Other Than English (LOTE)
Chinese
Chinese Heritage
French
French Continuers
French Extension
Japanese
Japanese Continuers
Japanese Extension
Latin
Latin Continuers
Latin Extension
Legal Studies
Mind and Morality (via the University of Sydney)
Music
Music 1
Music 2
Music Extension
Textiles and Design
Visual Arts
Visual Design

For some subjects, clubs are formed for extension or to cater to specific interests within the subject. These include Art Club, Astronomy Club, Book Club, Creative Writing Club, Social Justice Club, Maths Club and Sustainability Club.

Grounds, buildings, and facilities

Margaret Varady Rowing Facility 
Since 1987, the SGHS Rowing Club has shared space with the UNSW Rowing Club and operated its rowing activities using the UNSW boatshed at Tarban Creek, near the Tarban Creek Bridge, Gladesville at Huntleys Point, New South Wales. Her Excellency, Professor Marie Bashir AC, CVO, Governor of NSW formally opened the new boatshed on 28 June 2009.

The SGHS section of the boatshed was named the Margaret Varady Rowing Facility in honour of the contribution made by the former principal Margaret Varady towards schoolgirl rowing, including having been instrumental in securing the land and funding to build the boatshed.

Ethel Turner Memorial Library
The Ethel Turner Memorial Library, named in honour of the novelist Ethel Turner who was in the first enrolment in 1883, includes a senior study area and expandable seminar rooms. The Library is also a prime presentation space with data projection, video conferencing and Virtual Reality headsets. Within the Library precincts are non-fiction and fiction books, graphic novels, books in foreign languages to assist in LOTE study, and the school Archives.

Co- and extracurricular activities

Debating and public speaking
SGHS has an extensive debating tradition, and all students are provided the opportunity to develop their skills through weekly coaching and debating or speaking sessions, both social and competitive. SGHS competes in Combined High Schools (CHS) debating competitions and regularly has social debates with other schools, including its brother school, Sydney Boys High School; Sydney Grammar School; the Scots College; and St. Joseph's College, Hunters Hill. 

In both 2004 and 2005, SGHS won the Hume Barbour Trophy for the Premier's Debating Challenge. In 2010, SGHS won the Sydney University Senior Debating Cup and the Eastside Debating Competition. In 2012, 2013, 2015 and 2019 SGHS won the Karl Cramp Trophy for the Year 11 Premier's Debating Challenge. In 2010 and 2014, SGHS students won the Plain English Speaking Award.

Sport
Sydney Girls High School has a long tradition[ of sports, in addition to academic scholarship and offers students a range of extra-curricular sports, including athletics, badminton, basketball, chess, cricket, cross country running, fencing, hockey, rowing, snow sports, soccer, swimming, table tennis, tennis, volleyball, water polo, and netball.

These sports are offered both within the school and at an inter-school level. Students compete in the CHS competitions for many of the above sports, including athletics, cross country running, swimming, and rowing. Further sports are offered for within school education, such as zumba, yoga, archery, and quidditch. SGHS also holds three sports carnivals each year for Swimming, Cross Country, and Athletics.

Rowing 

The SGHS Rowing Club (SGHSRC) competes in competitions including the Schoolgirl Head of the River, the Riverview Gold Cup and the NSW Combined High Schools Regatta and has had successes in these competitions. The SGHSRC also hosts and competes in its own regatta, the schoolgirl SGHS Regatta, held at Iron Cove in late November each year. Many girls also win NSWCHSSA Blues for their achievements in rowing.

At the inaugural Schoolgirl Head of the River Regatta in 1991, the SGHSRC won the overall point score, as well as winning the races for the eight, the coxless quad scull, the coxless pair, the novice four and the coxed four; with the Senior 1st IV. The eight also won in the 1991 Head of Parramatta. The SGHS eight won the Schoolgirl Head of the River in 1992 and 1994, when it was held at Iron Cove.

In 2006 and 2007 the Senior 1st IV won the Schoolgirl Head of the River. In 2011 the Senior 1st IV can second in the Schoolgirl Head of the River. The rowing club also won the overall point score at the 2014 NSW CHS Regatta. In the 2015 Head of Parramatta, the coxed quad sculls won first and second place in the schoolgirl quad race.

Performing arts
SGHS has several dance groups, drama ensembles, and music groups, and a student-run Technical Company that oversees lighting and sound for school assemblies and performances. Annually, the Year 11 drama class put on a major production, which in 2009 was the Pulitzer-winning play Harvey. The school has an annual musicale and Christmas concert, which showcase the musical and dancing talent of students. SGHS also hosts a biennial musical co-production with Sydney Boys High, which in 2015 was the Tony Award winning Guys and Dolls.

With regards to drama, there are junior and senior co-curricular Drama Ensembles, an annual Shakespeare Festival in which students perform Shakespeare excerpts, and a "7/10 Director's Project" where Year 10 Drama students direct 10-minute plays starring Year 7 students. Further, SGHS is a serious contender in the annual Schools Theatresports Competition, their senior team achieving 2nd place and their junior team achieving 3rd place in the 2009 grand finals.

SGHS has a wide range of musical ensembles and bands, including:
Choir
Senior Vocal Ensemble
Junior Strings Ensemble
Orchestra
Chamber Orchestra
Junior Wind Ensemble
Symphonic Wind Ensemble
Jazz Band
Saxophone Ensemble

Many Year 12 SGHS students are invited to perform at the HSC Showcases onSTAGE and Encore.

Philanthropy

To support Oxfam, SGHS hosts an annual charity fundraiser. For each try scored during a touch football game played between Year 11 and Year 12 girls, ten dollars is donated to the charity.

Further, SGHS has been a large contributor to Stewart House, which has recognised the school's efforts with a Roy Reidy Trophy as the top contributor for the 16th year in a row. In 2011 the school was awarded the Norman B Ridge Red Cross Shield for collecting the largest amount of money for the Red Cross Calling. The Year Groups of 8, 9, and 10 each go out in the CBD and collect money for charities, with Year 8 collecting for Jeans for Genes Day, Year 9 collecting for the Cancer Council Daffodil Day, and Year 10 collecting for the Red Cross Calling and Legacy.

SGHS publishes an Imagizine, a compilation of student-submitted poetry, short stories, and artworks; the proceeds from which are donated to the Black Dog Institute. The body behind Imagizine meets every Thursday and is open to all current SGHS students.

SGHS also has Knitting in Company and Environment Group. Knitting in Company is an activity held after school, during which students knit blankets that are then donated to Wrap with Love, a charity that provides blankets to people who are susceptible to hypothermia. Environment Group involves weekly meetings during which students tend to the school's vegetable gardens and discuss environmental issues. The Environment Group is also responsible for promoting the annual Green Day.

The school also has a Social Justice Club that meets weekly and takes on a new social justice project each term – past projects include LGBT rights, mental illness awareness, refugee aid, and global women's rights.

Other opportunities
Like many Australian schools, SGHS encourages students to take part in the Duke of Edinburgh's Award, offering a school-organised hike to Year 9 students for the Expedition component of the award. SGHS also offers the High Resolves Global Leadership program to Year 9 and 10 students.
In addition, SGHS participates in numerous academic competitions including the Da Vinci Decathlon and Tournament of Minds. In the 2013 'Race Around the Renaissance' Da Vinci Decathlon, SGHS came first. In the 2015 Tournament of Minds, SGHS won the Maths & Engineering division, and gained honours in the Social Sciences division.

With regards to overseas tours, students are often offered the opportunity to travel to China, France, Japan, Germany, and Italy. This is often for LOTE or ancient history study. There is also a student exchange program set up with Beijing Normal High School in China, The Lycée Paul Cézanne in France, and the Konan Girls High School in Japan.

There is also a SGHS cadet program at Sydney Boys High School.

School traditions

Leadership
Each year, a team of Year 12 prefects are elected by the student body (excluding Year 7). The prefect executive is made up of the school captain, vice captain, senior prefect, welfare captain, and Student Representative Council (SRC) captain. There are also Prefects for each grade as well as for interest areas such as Sport, Welfare, Public Relations, Co-curricular, Community Service and CAPA. The SRC is made up of elected representatives from each grade from Years 7 to 11. The SRC duties include welcoming school visitors at events, leading and facilitating fundraising events, helping at the school canteen, and organising the annual Junior Dance that is open to SGHS and SBHS students Years 7 to 9.
There is also a Leadership Award Program in which students fulfil criteria based on academic achievement, sport participation, co-curricular achievement, and community service. There are bronze, silver, gold, and school medal levels to the Program.

Additionally, there is a Peer Support Program where Year 10 students work with Year 7 students to help them get to know the school and become leaders within the school community. New students are allocated a buddy in their class who provides practical assistance and advice about the school.

Houses
As with most Australian schools, SGHS utilises a house system. Students are allocated to a house when they enter the school according to Technology classes. There are four different houses under which students compete for the Swimming, Athletics and Cross Country Carnivals:

With the exception of Macquarie, all of the houses are named after former principals of the school.

Principals

Notable alumnae

Entertainment, media and the arts
Mena Kasmiri Abdullah - writer
Glenda Adams (Felton) – novelist and short story writer, best known as the winner of the 1987 Miles Franklin Award for Dancing on Coral
Dorothy Alison – actor
Patricia Thelma Amphlett OAM (a.k.a. Little Pattie) – National President of the Media, Entertainment and Arts Alliance; Singer/Performer
Suzanne Baker – film producer, first Australian woman to win an Academy Award
Marjorie Faith (Marjory) Barnard – author
Hilary Bell  playwright
Lucy Bell – actor
Natasha Liu Bordizzo – actor and model
Zora Bernice May Cross – writer
Ellen Dymphna (Nell) Cusack – author
Marele Day – author
Justine Ettler – author
Margaret Fink – film producer
Tanya Halesworth – TV presenter
Libby Hathorn – children's author
Enid Olive Mary Moodie Heddle – author, editor, and publisher of children’s books
Sacha Horler – actor
Justine Clarke – actor/children's entertainer
Myfanwy Horne – journalist, writer, reviewer and book editor
Rebecca Huntley – writer, social commentator, researcher, radio cohost
Ida Emily Leeson – librarian
Jeannie Lewis – singer/actor/writer 
Kate Lilley – academic and poet
Rachael Maza Long – actor, Artistic Director, Ilbijerri Theatre
Marie Louise Hamilton Mack – writer
Gwenyth (Gwen) Valmai Meredith – playwright and author, "Blue Hills"
Madoline (Nina) Murdoch – writer
Dora Ohlfsen-Bagge (1869–1948), sculptor 
Jessica Rowe – journalist and TV presenter
Christina Ellen Stead - author
Muriel Myee Steinbeck – actor
Ethel Turner – author; wrote "Seven Little Australians"
Lilian Wattnall Burwell Turner – author and journalist
Julia Zemiro – actor, comedian and TV presenter

Medicine and science
Agnes Elizabeth Lloyd Bennett – pioneering medical practitioner and scientist; in 1894, the first woman to graduate with honours in Science at the University of Sydney (also attended Cheltenham Ladies' College, Dulwich Girls' High School and Abbotsleigh)
Elsie Jean Dalyell– pathologist; with two other women, graduated Bachelor of Medicine with First-Class Honours in 1909, the first women in the Faculty at University of Sydney.
Lucy Edith Gullett – medical practitioner and philanthropist
Florence Violet McKenzie (Granville) OBE – first woman Electrical Engineer in Australia and Ham Radio Operator
Ruby Payne-Scott – Australia's first radio-physicist
Vicki Rubian Sara – scientist, researcher, academic; Chancellor of the University of Technology Sydney (2004–2016)
Claire Weekes – zoologist and physician

Politics, public service and law
Kath Anderson – politician
Winsome Hall Andrew – architect
Marie Bashir – first female Governor of New South Wales; former Chancellor of the University of Sydney; psychiatrist
Coral Bell – academic and expert on international relations
Ada Beveridge – Country Women's Association leader
Freda Brown – activist, journalist and political candidate
Totti Cohen – solicitor and former president of the Federation of P&C Associations
Eva Cox – writer, feminist, sociologist, social commentator and activist
Barbara Darling – Bishop and teacher
Robin Dunster – nurse and former chief of staff of the Salvation Army International (first woman to hold the office)
Ada Evans – first woman in Australia to gain law degree but not permitted to practise
Marie Fisher – politician
Libby Hathorn – author
Anna Katzmann – Judge of the Federal Court of Australia
Delcia Kite – politician
Irene Longman – politician and community worker
Lyndel Prott – lawyer and legal academic
Lee Rhiannon – MLCNSW Greens (School Vice-Captain 1969)
Lucinda Mary Turnbull – businesswoman, philanthropist, former local government politician, Lord Mayor of Sydney 2003–2004 (first woman to hold the position)
Jan Wade – Attorney General, barrister, Commissioner, lawyer, legal academic, Minister, Parliamentarian

Sport
Edith Cochrane – 1956 Melbourne Olympics, Flat water – LK1500 m Kayak Single
Mary Breen – Olympic athlete
Tracy Brook – 1988 Calgary Olympics aged 17 (25th/31) National Women's Figure Skating Champion
Thelma Dorothy Coyne – champion tennis player
Jessi Miley-Dyer – junior world champion surfer
Pat Norton – Olympic swimmer 1936 Berlin games (age 16); gold medal for 110 yards backstroke, silver medal in 100 yards Freestyle Relay, Bronze in 100 yards Medley Relay at 1938 Empire Games Sydney.
Jane Saville – Olympic Walker 1996, 2000 and 2004
Julie Speight – Olympic Cyclist – 1988 Seoul Olympics (5th place); first Australian woman to compete at an International track championship

Other 

 Dorothy 'Dot' Butler (née English)  –  bushwalker, mountaineer, and conservationist.

See also 

 List of government schools in New South Wales
 List of selective high schools in New South Wales

References

External links 

 Sydney Girls High School website

Educational institutions established in 1883
Girls' schools in New South Wales
Public high schools in Sydney
Selective schools in New South Wales
Moore Park, New South Wales
1883 establishments in Australia